Volkswagen of South Africa (Pty.) Ltd. is the South African subsidiary of German automotive manufacturing company Volkswagen Group based in Kariega (previously Uitenhage), Eastern Cape.

History
As early as the 1930s, the manufacturer Studebaker had explored the possibilities of an assembly plant in South Africa. In 1947, an assembly plant was built in Uitenhage near Port Elizabeth.

At around the same time, Klaus von Oertzen, a former executive member of Auto Union, tried to get DKW models assembled in South Africa. Despite his considerable commitment, this attempt was just as unsuccessful as his first attempt to export Volkswagen models to South Africa. After renewed efforts and lengthy negotiations, production of the Beetle began on 31 August 1951 at South Africa Motor Assemblers and Distributors (SAMAD) in Uitenhage.

Volkswagen acquired a blocking minority in SAMAD in 1956. At the same time von Oertzen became the chairman of the board of SAMAD; he was nominally supposed to be followed by Heinrich Nordhoff in 1963. In 1966, SAMAD was renamed Volkswagen of South Africa Limited at an extraordinary general meeting. In 1966, SAMAD, in which Volkswagenwerk AG held 63% of the shares at the time, had around 2,460 employees and sold 21,888 vehicles. With 36,315 vehicles, Volkswagen became the best-selling brand in South Africa for the first time in 1973. In 1974, the plant became a wholly-owned subsidiary of the Volkswagen Group.

In 2011, the plant in Uitenhage was the only non-European plant, besides the subsidiary in Mexico, that exported vehicles. From 2008 to 2013, Volkswagen was the market leader in the South African passenger car market. In 2015, Volkswagen of South Africa had 5600 employees.

Uitenhage Plant production

Current 

 Volkswagen Polo (1996–present)
 Volkswagen Polo Vivo

Former 

 Volkswagen Golf (1984–2013)
 Volkswagen Citi Golf
 Volkswagen Jetta/Fox (1982–2010)
 Volkswagen Transporter/Kombi (1955–)
 Volkswagen Beetle (1951–)

References

External links 
 

Volkswagen Group
Car manufacturers of South Africa
South African subsidiaries of foreign companies
Vehicle manufacturing companies established in 1946
1946 establishments in South Africa
Economy of the Eastern Cape
Nelson Mandela Bay Metropolitan Municipality